Ana Derșidan-Ene-Pascu (22 September 1944 – 6 April 2022) was a Romanian fencer and sport leader. She won a bronze medal in the women's team foil events at the 1968 and 1972 Summer Olympics.

Biography
The daughter of the vice-president of the Romanian Table Tennis Federation, Pascu was fascinated as a child by elite sport. Her first sport idols were table tennis players Angelica Rozeanu and Sari Szasz, who were then at the peak of their careers. When Pascu's father took a position at the Romanian Fencing Federation, she transferred her interests to the sport, which was practiced at the Athenaeum of Bucharest, and whose athletes spoke French. At the age of eleven, she began to take fencing lessons with Italian master Angelo Pellegrini. Future champion Maria Vicol featured amongst his other pupils.

Pascu won the 1963 Junior World Championship in Ghent, a result she considered as the best of her career. She joined the senior national team, which featured Maria Vicol and Marina Stanca. They were later joined by Olga Szabo, Ileana Gyulai, Ecaterina Stahl, and Suzana Ardeleanu. Romania was one of the only countries at the time offering centralised training in fencing: the national team trained twice a day, nine months a year. She made a brilliant career with the Romanian team: she won seven medals in the World Championships and took part in five Olympic Games, earning two bronze medals in 1968 and 1972. She was awarded the title of master emeritus in sports for her performance.

She retired in 1976, after the Summer Olympics of Montreal. In 1981, she gave birth to a son, Alexandru. She led the Romanian Fencing Federation from 1982 to 2013, when she opted not to run for a new term, leaving the road open to Mihai Covaliu. She served as honorary president of the FRS. She was also vice-president of the Romanian Olympic and Sports Committee since 2004.

Pascu was a member of the Rules Commission of the International Fencing Federation (FIE) from 1984 to 1996 and sat at the Refereeing Commission from 1996 to 2004. She was a member of the executive committee of the FIE since 2000 and a vice-president between 2004 and 2021.

References

External links 

 
 
 

1944 births
2022 deaths
Romanian female fencers
Romanian foil fencers
Olympic fencers of Romania
Fencers at the 1964 Summer Olympics
Fencers at the 1968 Summer Olympics
Fencers at the 1972 Summer Olympics
Fencers at the 1976 Summer Olympics
Olympic bronze medalists for Romania
Sportspeople from Bucharest
Olympic medalists in fencing
Medalists at the 1968 Summer Olympics
Medalists at the 1972 Summer Olympics
Presidents of the Romanian Fencing Federation